Webster is a town in Jackson County, North Carolina, United States. As of the 2010 census, the population was 363, down from 486 in 2000.

Webster was the first county seat of Jackson County, until Sylva assumed the role in 1913.

Geography
Webster is located in north-central Jackson County at  (35.345264, -83.213460), north of the Tuckasegee River. North Carolina Highway 116 runs through the town, leading east  to North Carolina Highway 107 and west across the Tuckasegee  to U.S. Route 23. NC 107 runs along the eastern edge of Webster, leading north  to Sylva and south  to Cullowhee.

Demographics

As of the census of 2000, there were 486 people, 200 households, and 141 families residing in the town. The population density was 303.3 people per square mile (117.3/km). There were 227 housing units at an average density of 141.7/sq mi (54.8/km). The racial makeup of the town was 94.03% White, 2.06% African American, 1.03% Asian, 0.41% from other races, and 2.47% from two or more races. Hispanic or Latino of any race were 1.03% of the population.

There were 200 households, out of which 32.5% had children under the age of 18 living with them, 54.0% were married couples living together, 14.5% had a female householder with no husband present, and 29.5% were non-families. 27.5% of all households were made up of individuals, and 11.5% had someone living alone who was 65 years of age or older. The average household size was 2.28 and the average family size was 2.72.

In the town, the population was spread out, with 24.5% under the age of 18, 6.0% from 18 to 24, 20.2% from 25 to 44, 31.1% from 45 to 64, and 18.3% who were 65 years of age or older. The median age was 45 years. For every 100 females, there were 72.3 males. For every 100 females age 18 and over, there were 71.5 males.

The median income for a household in the town was $40,313, and the median income for a family was $46,042. Males had a median income of $40,000 versus $30,278 for females. The per capita income for the town was $21,019. About 14.5% of families and 12.8% of the population were below the poverty line, including 15.2% of those under age 18 and 1.3% of those age 65 or over.

History

Webster was founded in 1851 in order to serve as the county seat of Jackson County. A massive fire and the railroad's failure to come to the town caused the larger and more powerful railroading center of Sylva to take over the position of county seat. Webster once had a courthouse and many shops, but few of the buildings that hint at its vibrant past as a thriving county seat survive.

Several buildings on the National Register of Historic Places are within the town. The Lucius Coleman Hall House, the Elisha Calor Hedden House, the Walter E. Moore House, and the old Webster Rock Schoolhouse, built by the Works Progress Administration in 1936, were all listed in 1990. The Webster Baptist Church, built in 1900, and the Webster Methodist Church, next to the old school and built around the same time, were listed in 1989; the former is across the Tuckasegee River outside the town limits but still considered to be in Webster.

Photo gallery

See also
National Register of Historic Places listings in Jackson County, North Carolina

References

External links
 Town of Webster official website

Towns in Jackson County, North Carolina
Towns in North Carolina
Populated places established in 1851
1851 establishments in North Carolina